William Cooper's Town: Power and Persuasion on the Frontier of the Early American Republic is a history book written by American historian Alan Taylor, published by Vintage in August 1996. It profiles the life of William Cooper, father of novelist James Fenimore Cooper, on the frontier of upstate New York. The book won the 1996 Pulitzer Prize for History.

References

1996 non-fiction books
20th-century history books
Pulitzer Prize for History-winning works
History books about the United States
Alfred A. Knopf books
Bancroft Prize-winning works